Wojciech Matusiak (born 2 June 1945) is a former Polish cyclist. He competed in the team pursuit at the 1968 Summer Olympics. He won the Tour de Pologne 1969.

References

External links
 

1945 births
Living people
Polish male cyclists
Olympic cyclists of Poland
Cyclists at the 1968 Summer Olympics
People from Sieraków
Sportspeople from Greater Poland Voivodeship
20th-century Polish people